Vladimir Yakovlevich Voroshilov (born name Vladimir Kolmanovich, 18 December 1930 in Simferopol – 10 March 2001 in Peredelkino, Moscow Oblast) was an author, producer and anchorman of the television show What? Where? When?, and a member of the Russian Academy of Television. He served from 1989 as president of the International Association of Clubs.

Biography 
Voroshilov was born as Vladimir Kolmanovich in Simferopol, to senior ministerial official Yakov Davidovich Kolmanovich and his wife Vera Borisovna, a seamstress. In 1943 the family evacuated to Moscow.

In Moscow, Voroshilov attended an artistic school for gifted children, graduating to the faculty of painting at the State Art Institute of the Estonian SSR. He later studied also at Moscow Art Theatre (MKhAT). In 1954 he spent a year in Germany, as an artist in the theatre of the Group of Soviet Forces in Germany. In 1955—1965, with MKhAT, he was involved in operatic theatre. He became a producer at the Contemporary and at the  Taganka Theatre.

References

External links
Vladimir Voroshilov at  the Сhgk

1930 births
2001 deaths
Russian game show hosts
Soviet television presenters
Russian television presenters
Soviet theatre directors
Burials at Vagankovo Cemetery
Estonian Academy of Arts alumni
Theatre directors from Moscow